Kensington and Chelsea was a constituency represented in the House of Commons of the Parliament of the United Kingdom 1997–2010. It was one of the safest Conservative seats in the United Kingdom, and since its creation in 1997 became a prestigious seat, with  MP Alan Clark, the former Defence Secretary Michael Portillo and the former Foreign Secretary Malcolm Rifkind all holding the seat for the Conservatives. The seat was abolished for the 2010 election, when the 1974–1997 Kensington constituency was recreated and Chelsea formed a new constituency together with the southern part of the former Hammersmith and Fulham constituency, called the Chelsea and Fulham constituency.

Boundaries 
The constituency covered the central and southern portions of the Royal Borough of Kensington and Chelsea, covering the centres of both Kensington and Chelsea. This covered the following wards of the borough:
 Abingdon, Brompton, Campden, Cheyne, Church, Courtfield, Earls Court, Hans Town, Holland, Norland, North Stanley, Pembridge, Queen's Gate, Redcliffe, Royal Hospital, South Stanley.

Following their review of parliamentary boundaries in North London, the Boundary Commission created two new constituencies based on the existing Kensington and Chelsea constituency, which were first contested at the 2010 election. The northern section (Earls Court, South Kensington, Kensington High Street and Holland Park) was combined with the southern section of the previous Regent's Park and Kensington North constituency (including Ladbroke Grove and Notting Hill) to create a new Kensington constituency, whilst the southern part (Chelsea) was combined with the southern half of the former Hammersmith and Fulham constituency to create a new Chelsea and Fulham constituency.

History 

The constituency was created for the 1997 general election. Notional calculations indicated that it would be one of the safest Conservative seats in the country and so the Conservative nomination was much sought. In the run-up to the 1997 election the nomination was initially won by Nicholas Scott, MP for the previous Chelsea constituency, but following allegations of alcoholism he was deselected.

The nomination was subsequently secured by Alan Clark, the former minister and diarist who was seeking to return to the Commons after standing down at the 1992 general election. Clark was elected, but died of brain cancer in 1999 after only two years in office. As a safe Conservative seat in London there was much speculation that former Defence Secretary and widely predicted future Conservative leader Michael Portillo would seek to return to the Commons after losing the Enfield Southgate constituency in the 1997 election. Portillo was elected in the subsequent by-election and became Shadow Chancellor but his subsequent career stalled and he crashed out of the 2001 Conservative Party leadership election and returned to the backbenches. In 2003 he announced his intention to retire from politics at the next general election to pursue a career in the media. Another former Cabinet Minister, who had also lost his seat in 1997, Sir Malcolm Rifkind, was nominated for the seat in Portillo's stead and elected at the 2005 general election.

In October 2007, amid speculation that then-Prime Minister Gordon Brown was about to call a snap general election, former Labour minister Tony Benn announced that he wanted to come out of retirement and return to the Commons, offering himself to the Kensington and Chelsea constituency Labour Party to challenge Malcolm Rifkind. Ultimately, however, no election was held that year, and the Kensington and Chelsea seat was abolished for the 2010 election.

Members of Parliament

Elections

Elections in the 2000s

Elections in the 1990s

See also 
 List of parliamentary constituencies in London
 1999 Kensington and Chelsea by-election

References 
 BBC News (2005). Election 2005 -  Kensington & Chelsea. Retrieved May 3, 2005.

Politics of the Royal Borough of Kensington and Chelsea
Constituencies of the Parliament of the United Kingdom established in 1997
Constituencies of the Parliament of the United Kingdom disestablished in 2010
Parliamentary constituencies in London (historic)